Der kom en dag is a 1955 Danish dramatic film directed by Sven Methling,  It stars John Wittig, Kjeld Jacobsen and Astrid Villaume as Danish resistance fighters during the last days of the German occupation of Denmark in World War II.

Cast 
 John Wittig
 Astrid Villaume
 Kjeld Jacobsen
 Louis Miehe-Renard
 Kate Mundt
 Jakob Nielsen (actor)
 Poul Müller
 Svend Methling
 Gabriel Axel
 Inger Lassen
 
 Hans Egede Budtz
 
 Bent Christensen

Production
The film was produced by John Olsen at Saga Studio. Co-written by Olsen and Flemming Muus, it is based on a true story as told in Muus' novel of the same name.

Locations used in the film include Amalienborg Palace,  Hvidovre Church, Copenhagen Police Headquarters and Copenhagen City Hall.

Reception
It won the 1955 Bodil Award for Best Danish Film (in a tie with Carl Th. Dreyer's Ordet).

References

External links 
 
 
 

1955 films
1950s Danish-language films
1950s historical drama films
1950s war drama films
Danish historical drama films
Danish war drama films
1955 drama films
Films set in Copenhagen
Films set in the 1940s
Films directed by Sven Methling
Films scored by Sven Gyldmark
Films based on Danish novels
Danish black-and-white films
Danish World War II films
Films about Danish resistance movement
World War II films based on actual events
Best Danish Film Bodil Award winners